John Davis (June 18, 1929 – March 2017) was an American rower. He competed in the men's coxless four event at the 1952 Summer Olympics.

References

1929 births
2017 deaths
American male rowers
Olympic rowers of the United States
Rowers at the 1952 Summer Olympics
Sportspeople from Santa Monica, California